The MIT Press is a university press affiliated with the Massachusetts Institute of Technology (MIT) in Cambridge, Massachusetts (United States). It was established in 1962.

History 
The MIT Press traces its origins back to 1926 when MIT published under its own name a lecture series entitled Problems of Atomic Dynamics given by the visiting German physicist and later Nobel Prize winner, Max Born. Six years later, MIT's publishing operations were first formally instituted by the creation of an imprint called Technology Press in 1932. This imprint was founded by James R. Killian, Jr., at the time editor of MIT's alumni magazine and later to become MIT president. Technology Press published eight titles independently, then in 1937 entered into an arrangement with John Wiley & Sons in which Wiley took over marketing and editorial responsibilities. In 1962 the association with Wiley came to an end after a further 125 titles had been published. The press acquired its modern name after this separation, and has since functioned as an independent publishing house.

A European marketing office was opened in 1969, and a Journals division was added in 1972. In the late 1970s, responding to changing economic conditions, the publisher narrowed the focus of their catalog to a few key areas, initially architecture, computer science and artificial intelligence, economics, and cognitive science.

In January 2010 the MIT Press published its 9000th title, and in 2012 the Press celebrated its 50th anniversary, including publishing a commemorative booklet on paper and online.

The press co-founded the distributor TriLiteral LLC with Yale University Press and Harvard University Press. TriLiteral was acquired by LSC Communications in 2018.

In July 2020, the MIT Press transitioned its worldwide sales and distribution to Penguin Random House Publisher Services.

Business
The MIT Press primarily publishes academic and general interest titles in the fields of Art and Architecture; Visual and Cultural Studies; Cognitive Science; Philosophy; Linguistics; Computer Science; Economics; Finance and Business; Environmental Science; Political Science; Life Sciences; Neuroscience; New Media; and Science, Technology, and Society.

The MIT Press is a distributor for Semiotext(e), Goldsmiths Press, Strange Attractor Press, Sternberg Press, Terra Nova Press, Urbanomic, and Sequence Press. In 2000, the MIT Press created CogNet, an online resource for the study of the brain and the cognitive sciences. 

In 1981, the MIT Press published its first book under the Bradford Books imprint, Brainstorms: Philosophical Essays on Mind and Psychology by Daniel C. Dennett.

In 2018, the Press and the MIT Media Lab launched the Knowledge Futures Group to develop and deploy open access publishing technology and platforms.

In 2019, the Press launched the MIT Press Reader, a digital magazine that draws on the Press's archive and family of authors to produce adapted excerpts, interviews, and other original works. The publication describes itself as one which "aims to illuminate the bold ideas and voices that make up the Press’s expansive catalog, to revisit overlooked passages, and to dive into the stories that inspired the books".

Colophon

The MIT Press uses a colophon or logo designed by its longtime design director, Muriel Cooper, in 1962. The design is based on a highly abstracted version of the lower-case letters "mitp", with the ascender of the "t" at the fifth stripe and the descender of the "p" at the sixth stripe the only differentiation. It later served as an important reference point for the 2015 redesign of the MIT Media Lab logo by Pentagram.

Open Access 
The MIT Press is a leader in open access book publishing. They published their first open access book in 1995 with the publication of William Mitchell's City of Bits, which appeared simultaneously in print and in a dynamic, open web edition. They now publish open access books, textbooks, and journals. Open access journals include American Journal of Law and Equality, Computational Linguistics, Data Intelligence, Harvard Data Science Review, Network Neuroscience, Neurobiology of Language, Open Mind, Projections, Quantitative Science Studies, Rapid Reviews: COVID-19, Transactions of the Association of Computational Linguistics, and Thresholds.

In 2021, the Press launched Direct to Open, a framework for open access monographs. In 2022, Direct to Open published 80 monographs.  MIT Press Open Architecture and Urban Studies is a digital collection of classic and previously out-of-print architecture and urban studies books hosted on the digital book platform, MIT Press Direct.

MIT Kids Press and MITeen Press 
In 2019, the MIT Press partnered with Candlewick Press to launch two new imprints for young readers, MIT Kids Press and MITeen Press to publish books for children and young adults on STEAM topics.

List of journals published by the MIT Press

Arts and humanities

 African Arts
 ARTMargins
 Computer Music Journal
 Daedalus
 Design Issues
 Grey Room
 JoDS: Journal of Design and Science
 Leonardo
 Leonardo Music Journal
 The New England Quarterly
 October
 PAJ: A Journal of Performance and Art
 Projections
 Thresholds

Economics

 Asian Economic Papers
 Cryptoeconomic Systems
 Education Finance and Policy
 The Review of Economics and Statistics

International affairs, history, and political science

 American Journal of Law and Equality
 Global Environmental Politics
 Innovations
 International Security
 Journal of Cold War Studies
 Journal of Interdisciplinary History
 Perspectives on Science

Science and technology

 Artificial Life
 Computational Linguistics
 Data Intelligence
 Evolutionary Computation
 Harvard Data Science Review
 Journal of Cognitive Neuroscience
 Linguistic Inquiry
 Network Neuroscience
 Neural Computation
 Neurobiology of Language
 Open Mind: Discoveries in Cognitive Science
 Presence: Teleoperators & Virtual Environments
 Quantitative Science Studies
 Rapid Reviews: COVID-19
 Transactions of the Association for Computational Linguistics

See also

 List of English-language book publishing companies
 List of university presses

References

External links 

Official website
MIT Press Journals homepage
The MIT PressLog (no longer in use, news blog for the MIT Press)
The MIT Press Reader
The MIT Press Blog
The MIT Press Podcast

 
University presses of the United States